Maria Stefania Bohuszewiczówna (1865–1887) was a Polish revolutionary and a leader of the First Proletariat party.

Bohuszewiczówna was born on January 4, 1865, in the village of Ceperce (near Slutsk in what is now Belarus). She moved to Warsaw in 1874. In 1882 and 1883 she attended courses at the Flying University. From 1882 she was active in the Political Red Cross. After a wave of arrests in July 1884, Bohuszewiczówna, aged 19, was elected to lead the central committee of the First Proletariat party. 

On March 2, 1885, Bohuszewiczówna organized a demonstration for the unemployed at Castle Square. For this activity she was arrested on September 29, 1885, and imprisoned in the Warsaw Citadel. After Bohuszewiczówna's arrest, leadership of the party went to Marian Ulrych. On May 12, 1887, she was sentenced to internal exile in Siberia. She died in 1887 in Krasnoyarsk while on the way to her assigned location.

Bohuszewiczówna was the great-granddaughter of the Polish statesman Tadeusz Kościuszko.

References 

1865 births
1887 deaths
Polish revolutionaries
Polish people who died in prison custody
Date of death unknown